James Jonah Cummings (born November 3, 1952) is an American voice actor. Since beginning his career in the 1980s, he has appeared in almost 400 roles. Cummings has frequently worked with The Walt Disney Company and Warner Bros., including as the official voice of Winnie the Pooh since 1988, Tigger since 1989, the Tasmanian Devil since 1991, and Pete since 1992. Other notable roles include Fat Cat and Monterey Jack on Chip 'n Dale: Rescue Rangers (1989–1990), the title character of Darkwing Duck (1991–1992), Dr. Robotnik on the Sonic the Hedgehog animated series (1993–1994), Kaa on Jungle Cubs (1996–1998), and Cat on CatDog (1998–2005).

Early life
Born in Youngstown, Ohio, Cummings relocated to New Orleans, where he designed and painted Mardi Gras floats, worked as a river boat deck hand, and sang and played drums in the regionally-successful rock band Fusion. He attended Immaculate Conception and St. Columba grade schools as well as Ursuline High School and graduated from there in 1970.

He later married and moved to Anaheim, California, where he managed a video store in the early 1980s, before launching his voice acting career in late 1984.

Career

Cummings's first voice role was as Lionel the Lion and Aunt Fira in Dumbo's Circus. Some of Cummings' earliest vocal work was at Disney, where he replaced Sterling Holloway as the voice of Winnie the Pooh in 1988. He was the understudy for Paul Winchell as Tigger, before fully replacing him as the character in 2000's The Tigger Movie. In 1991, he was hired by Warner Bros. Animation to voice Taz on the animated series Taz-Mania and would continue to voice the character in various Looney Tunes media.

When actor Jeremy Irons, the voice of Scar in The Lion King, developed vocal problems during recording of the song "Be Prepared", Cummings replaced him on the remainder of the track along with providing the voice for Ed the hyena. He also provided Scar's voice in a brief nightmare sequence in The Lion King II: Simba's Pride. Cummings would later be hired as the singing double for Russell Means in Pocahontas, the speaking voice of Kekata in Pocahontas, and the singing voice of Grigori Rasputin in Anastasia.

In commercials, he voiced Smokey Bear in several commercials, ads, and promos from 1993 to 2006.

In 2018, he became the first voice performer of animation to reprise his role(s) for a live-action Disney film, reprising the roles of Winnie the Pooh and Tigger for the film Christopher Robin. His performance as Pooh was particularly praised by Richard Lawson of Vanity Fair, who felt it was "Oscar-worthy" and said that "[a]s Winnie the Pooh … the veteran voice actor gives such sweet, rumpled, affable life to the wistful bear of literary renown that it routinely breaks the heart."

Personal life
Cummings has two daughters with his former wife Stephanie Jardon. The two were married from 2001 to 2011, when they divorced; in 2019 they became involved in an acrimonious custody dispute. Cummings also has two older daughters from a previous marriage.

Filmography

Accolades

References

External links

 
 
 
 Jim Cummings  at Voice Chasers
 Jim Cummings Interview at Toon Zone
 
 Jim Cummings feature article and photos at Voice Actors in the News
 Jim Cummings ' Imaginography at Imagine Casting
 

1952 births
Living people
20th-century American male actors
21st-century American male actors
20th-century Roman Catholics
21st-century Roman Catholics
American impressionists (entertainers)
American male video game actors
American male voice actors
Animal impersonators
Audiobook narrators
Disney people
Hanna-Barbera people
Male actors from Youngstown, Ohio